The Christian Social People's Party, abbreviated to CSV or PCS, is the largest political party in Luxembourg. The party follows a Christian-democratic and conservative ideology and, like most parties in Luxembourg, is strongly pro-European. The CSV is a member of the European People's Party (EPP) and the Centrist Democrat International (CDI).

The CSV has been the largest party in the Chamber of Deputies since the party's formation, and currently holds 21 of 60 seats in the Chamber. Since the Second World War, every Prime Minister of Luxembourg has been a member of the CSV, with only two exceptions:  Gaston Thorn (1974–1979), and Xavier Bettel (2013–). It holds two of Luxembourg's six seats in the European Parliament, as it has for 20 of the 30 years for which MEPs have been directly elected.

The party's President is since April 2021 Claude Wiseler. However, the leading figure from the party is the former Prime Minister, Jean-Claude Juncker, who previously governed in coalition with the Luxembourg Socialist Workers' Party (LSAP) until the 2013 general election.

History
The earliest roots of the CSV date back to the foundation of the Party of the Right on 16 January 1914.

In 1944, the Party of the Right was officially transformed into the CSV. The first elections after the Second World War took place in 1945; the party won 25 out of 51 seats, missing an absolute majority by a single seat.

From 1945 to 1974, the party was in government and gave Luxembourg the following Prime Ministers: Pierre Dupong, Joseph Bech, Pierre Frieden, and Pierre Werner. Mostly in coalition with the Democratic Party (DP), it gave Luxembourg a certain economic and social stability.

In the 1950s, the party structure underwent a certain democratisation: the party's youth section (founded in 1953) and women's section received representation in the party's central organs.

The party went into opposition for the first time in 1974, when the Democratic Party's Gaston Thorn became Prime Minister in coalition with the Luxembourg Socialist Workers' Party (LSAP). In 1979, the party returned to government after its victory in the 1979 general election; Pierre Werner became PM.

In 1984, Jacques Santer became PM. He remained as such until 1995, when Jean-Claude Juncker became PM, with Santer meanwhile taking up the post of President of the European Commission.

Following the 2013 general election, the party went into opposition for the second time in its history as the Democratic Party's Xavier Bettel became Prime Minister in coalition with the LSAP and The Greens, making it the first time in Luxembourg's history that a three-party coalition government had been formed. This also marked the first time that The Greens were part of a governmental coalition. Despite remaining the largest party, the result of the 2018 general election represented the lowest public support in the party's history.

Election results

Chamber of Deputies

European Parliament

Party office-holders

Presidents
 Émile Reuter (1945–1964)
 Tony Biever (1964–1965)
 Jean Dupong (1965–1972)
 Nicolas Mosar (1972–1974)
 Jacques Santer (1974–1982)
 Jean Spautz (1982–1990)
 Jean-Claude Juncker (1990–1995)
 Erna Hennicot-Schoepges (1995–2003)
 François Biltgen (2003–2009)
 Michel Wolter (2009–2014)
 Marc Spautz (2014–2019)
 Frank Engel (2019–2021)
 Claude Wiseler (2021–present)

General Secretaries
 Nicolas Hommel (1944–1946)
 Lambert Schaus (1945–1952)
 Pierre Grégoire (1952–1960)
 Nicolas Mosar (1960–1972)
 Jacques Santer (1972–1974)
 Jean Weber (1974–1977)
 Jean-Pierre Kraemer (1977–1984)
 Willy Bourg (1984–1990)
 Camille Dimmer (1990–1995)
 Claude Wiseler (1995–2000)
 Jean-Louis Schiltz (2000–2006)
 Marco Schank (2006–2009)
 Marc Spautz (2009–2012)
 Laurent Zeimet (2012–2019)
 Félix Eischen (2019–2021)
 Christophe Hansen (2021–present)

Presidents of Christian Social People's Party in the Chamber of Deputies
 Tony Biever (1959–1974)
 Pierre Werner (1974–1979)
 Nicolas Mosar (1979–1984)
 François Colling (1984–1995)
 Lucien Weiler (1996–2004)
 Michel Wolter (2004–2009)
 Jean-Louis Schiltz (2009–2011)
 Lucien Thiel (2011)+
 Marc Spautz (2011–2013)
 Gilles Roth (2013)
 Claude Wiseler (2014–2018)
 Martine Hansen (2018–present)

+ Died in office

See also

 List of political parties in Luxembourg

References

Further reading 
 
 Schaus, Émile (1974). Ursprung und Leistung einer Partei: Rechtspartei und Christlich-Soziale Volkspartei 1914-1974.  Luxembourg : Sankt-Paulus-Druckerei.
 Trausch, Gilbert, ed. (2008). CSV Spiegelbild eines Landes und seiner Politik? Geschichte der Christlich-Sozialen Volkspartei Luxemburgs im 20. Jahrhundert. Luxembourg: Éditions Saint-Paul.

External links

 

1944 establishments in Luxembourg
Political parties established in 1944
Catholic political parties
Centre-right parties in Europe
Christian democratic parties in Europe
Member parties of the European People's Party
Political parties in Luxembourg
Conservative parties in Luxembourg